Joel Stephen Dixon (born 9 December 1993) is an English professional footballer who plays as a goalkeeper for Bolton Wanderers.

Career
Born in Middlesbrough, Dixon began his career at Sunderland, spending two loan spells at Workington. He moved on loan to Boston United in November 2015. After a loan spell with Hartlepool United he moved on loan to Gateshead in March 2015.

Barrow
He moved to Barrow in 2015. Dixon was a part of the Barrow side that won the National League in the 2019–20 season, featuring in all 37 matches, before the early curtailment of the season due to the COVID-19 pandemic with Barrow being awarded the title after the standings were determined on a points-per-game basis. Dixon then appeared in all 46 matches the following season as Barrow avoided relegation. At the end of the 2020–21 season, Dixon was offered a new contract with the club.

Bolton Wanderers
On 25 June 2021, Bolton Wanderers announced that Dixon would join them on 1 July on a two-year deal after he rejected the contract offer from Barrow. His debut came on 10 August against EFL Championship side Barnsley in the Carabao Cup where he kept a clean sheet in a 0–0 draw and then saved Devante Cole's penalty in the resultant penalty shoot-out, helping Bolton win the game. His league debut came the following Saturday away at AFC Wimbledon.

Career statistics

Honours
Barrow
 National League: 2019–20

References

1993 births
Living people
English footballers
Association football goalkeepers
Sunderland A.F.C. players
Workington A.F.C. players
Boston United F.C. players
Hartlepool United F.C. players
Gateshead F.C. players
Barrow A.F.C. players
Bolton Wanderers F.C. players
National League (English football) players
English Football League players